Elizabeth Ivana Batchelor Batchelor (born 28 October 2000) is a Guatemalan professional model and beauty pageant titleholder who has represented her country in Miss Grand International 2020 and placed 2nd Runner-Up. She was crowned as Miss Universe Guatemala 2022 and represented Guatemala at Miss Universe 2022 competition but was unplaced.

Early life and education 
Batchelor was born on October 28, 2000 in Quetzaltenango. She is fluent in Spanish and English and does translation work for these two languages. She is the co-founder of IB Model Agency, a model management and training agency. She is currently studying Communication science.

Beauty contests

Miss Grand Guatemala 2020 
On March 16, 2020, Batchelor was crowned Miss Grand Guatemala 2020. She successfully surpassed Dannia Guevara.

Miss Grand International 2020 
On March 27, 2021, Batchelor represented Guatemala at Miss Grand International 2020 and competed against 62 other candidates at SHOW DC in Bangkok, Thailand. Won 2nd runner-up. She also became one of three winners in the Best National Costume category.

Miss Universe Guatemala 2022 
On June 3, 2022, Batchelor started crowned Miss Universe Guatemala 2022. She successfully surpassed Dannia Guevara.

Miss Universe 2022 
She represented Guatemala at Miss Universe 2022 but failed to make it to the top 16.

References

2000 births
Living people
Guatemalan female models
Miss Universe 2022 contestants